Fuchsia scherffiana is a species of plant in the family Onagraceae. It is endemic to Ecuador.

References

Endemic flora of Ecuador
scherffiana
Endangered plants
Taxonomy articles created by Polbot
Taxa named by Édouard André